Nilanjana is a 2017 Sri Lankan Sinhala drama thriller film directed by Nalaka Withanage and produced by Arosha Fernando. It stars Himali Siriwardena and newcomer Kelum Kularatne in lead roles along with Sriyani Amarasena and Anusha Damayanthi. It is the 1274th Sri Lankan film in the Sinhala cinema.

Cast
 Himali Siriwardena as Nilanjana
 Kelum Kularatne as Yomal
 Palitha Silva as Dananjaya
 Sriyani Amarasena as Samantha
 Anusha Damayanthi as Ayesha
 Manel Wanaguru as Shirani
 Bandula Vithanage as Densil
 Mahendra Weerarathne as Ayal
 Iresha Asanki as Ruvini
 Chulakshi Ranathunga as Amanda

References

External links
 
මා “නිලංජනා” අතහැර ගියේ නැහැ හැබැයි නිෂ්පාදක සමඟ යළි වැඩ නැහැ
ඔහු නෙවෙයි මමයි ඔහු සමඟ යළි වැඩ කරන්නේ නැත්තේ
මේ කේෂ්ත්‍රයේ ඔය වගේ කතා යනවා

2010s Sinhala-language films
2017 films